Dennis de Nooijer (born 4 April 1969 in Oost-Souburg, Zeeland) is a retired football (soccer) striker from the Netherlands, who played for Sparta Rotterdam (1987–1998), SC Heerenveen (1998–2002), NEC Nijmegen (2001–2003) and FC Dordrecht (2004–2005). He is the twin brother of defender Gérard de Nooijer, who also played professional football during the late 1980s and 1990s.

References
  Profile at beijen.net
  Profile at home.wanadoo.nl

1969 births
Living people
Dutch footballers
Association football forwards
Eredivisie players
Eerste Divisie players
Sparta Rotterdam players
SC Heerenveen players
FC Dordrecht players
NEC Nijmegen players
Dutch twins
Twin sportspeople
Sportspeople from Vlissingen
FC Twente non-playing staff
Footballers from Zeeland